This organisation is the national governing body for roller sports in the country. British Roller Sports Federation

See also

 International Roller Sports Federation
International Roller Sports Federation - Inline
 Roller derby in the United Kingdom

References

External links
Official website

Roller skating organizations
Roller derby in the United Kingdom
Roller sports